Angus Dewar (born 12 October 1992, formerly known as Angus Litherland) is a professional Australian rules footballer who played for the Hawthorn Football Club in the Australian Football League (AFL). In 2022 he returned to the AFL as a top-up player for West Coast when numerous players were excluded from the team for to Covid-19 related health and safety protocols.

AFL career 

Hawthorn selected Dewar with pick 55 in the 2010 AFL Draft. A foot injury finished his 2011 season whilst developing at Hawthorn's affiliate club Box Hill.
He spent 2013 developing in the VFL playing for Hawthorn's affiliate side Box Hill and was a member of their premiership winning side. Dewar made his AFL debut against Essendon in Round 2, 2014 as a late replacement for Sam Mitchell.

Dewar was used as a defender for the Hawks, he had a booming right foot kick and had plenty of dash off the half back line. Finding it difficult to break into a premiership winning side, Gus managed to play half a dozen games a season. In 2016 he started the year in the side only to drop out and ended the year with the Box Hill Hawks. At the conclusion of the 2016 season, he was delisted by Hawthorn.
In 2022, as a COVID-19 top-up player on the West Coast Eagles list, he played one game against the North Melbourne Kangaroos.
Dewar now plays for Subiaco in the WAFL where he has won three premierships.

Statistics

|- style=background:#EAEAEA
| 2011 ||  || 42
| 0 || — || — || — || — || — || — || — || — || — || — || — || — || — || — || 0
|-
| 2012 ||  || 42
| 0 || — || — || — || — || — || — || — || — || — || — || — || — || — || — || 0
|- style=background:#EAEAEA
| 2013 ||  || 31
| 0 || — || — || — || — || — || — || — || — || — || — || — || — || — || — || 0
|-
| 2014 ||  || 31
| 13 || 0 || 1 || 96 || 65 || 161 || 37 || 25 || 0.0 || 0.1 || 7.4 || 5.0 || 12.4 || 2.9 || 1.9 || 0
|- style=background:#EAEAEA
| 2015 ||  || 31
| 6 || 1 || 0 || 38 || 26 || 64 || 22 || 5 || 0.2 || 0.0 || 6.3 || 4.3 || 10.7 || 3.7 || 0.8 || 0
|-
| 2016 ||  || 17
| 6 || 0 || 0 || 30 || 32 || 62 || 15 || 15 || 0.0 || 0.0 || 5.0 || 5.3 || 10.3 || 2.5 || 2.5 || 0
|- class="sortbottom"
! colspan=3| Career
! 25 !! 1 !! 1 !! 164 !! 123 !! 287 !! 74 !! 45 !! 0.0 !! 0.0 !! 6.6 !! 4.9 !! 11.5 !! 3.0 !! 1.8 !! 0
|}

Honours and achievements
Team
 VFL premiership player: 2013
 Minor premiership: 2015

References

External links 

Claremont Football Club players
Hawthorn Football Club players
Box Hill Football Club players
1992 births
Living people
Australian rules footballers from Western Australia
Subiaco Football Club players
West Coast Eagles players